The Bishop of Bathurst is the diocesan bishop of the Anglican Diocese of Bathurst in the Anglican Church of Australia.

List of bishops

References

 
Lists of Anglican bishops and archbishops
Anglican bishops of Bathurst